Vanku or Vaanku may refer to:

 Vanku, a fictional sage from the Sanskrit poem Nava-sahasanka-charita
 Banku (call to prayer), the Muslim call to public prayer in the Malabar region
 "Vaanku", a short story by Unni R.
 Vaanku (film), a 2021 Malayalam film based on the story

See also
 Vank (disambiguation)
 Banku (disambiguation)